Fako is a division of Southwest Region in Cameroon. The division covers an area of 2,093 km and as of 2005 had a total population of 466,412. The capital of the department lies at Limbe.

Subdivisions
The division is divided administratively into 6 communes and in turn into sub-districts and villages. The Ambas Bay district is further divided into 3 sub-districts; Limbe I (Victoria), Limbe II (Botaland), Limbe III (Isubuland).

Communes 
 Buea 
 Ambas Bay (Limbe)
 Muyuka
 Tiko
 West Coast (Idenau)
 Lower Mungo:
 Bonaléa
 Dibombari
 Mbanga

See also
Communes of Cameroon

References

Departments of Cameroon
Southwest Region (Cameroon)